Steve Lee Curtis (born 1960) is a retired British professional wrestler. He was the light-middleweight British champion in 1987 by beating Bobby Collins.

After retiring in 2000, he returned to the ring ten years later and planned an X Factor style wrestling show, in an attempt to get British wrestling back on television.

Curtis lives in Wembley and now works as a porter at Northwick Park Hospital.

Championships and accomplishments 
Light-Middleweight British Championship (1987)

References 

1960 births
Living people
English male professional wrestlers
Sportspeople from London
Sportspeople from Wembley